Grace McCatty (born 28 September 1989) is an English footballer who plays as a defender for Sunderland in FA Women's National League North. Prior to her move to the North-East with Durham, she featured eight times in the UEFA Women's Champions League for Bristol City.

Playing career

Bristol City, 2006–2017 
McCatty signed with Bristol City ahead of the 2011 FA WSL season. She made her debut for the senior squad during a match against Birmingham City L.F.C. on 14 April 2011. She made 14 appearances during her first season with Bristol. The team finished in fifth place with a  record. During the 2012 FA WSL season, Matthews made 11 appearances helping the team finish in fourth place with a  record.

In 2014, McCatty played for Bristol in the 2014–15 UEFA Women's Champions League. Bristol was the only English team to make the quarterfinals where they were eliminated by eventual winners Frankfurt.  In 2015, she captained the team at the 2015–16 UEFA Women's Champions League.

Durham, 2017–2018
After over 100 appearances and just more than ten years with Bristol City, McCatty departed to join fellow FA WSL 2 side Durham.

Sunderland AFC, 2018- 
McCatty joined former Durham team-mate Jordan Atkinson at Sunderland for the 2018-19 season. She made her debut in a 2–1 away win at Bradford City in Sunderland's second game of the season.

Career statistics 
Correct as of 10 November 2019

Club

Honours

Bristol City 

 FA Women's Super League Runner-up: 2013 
 FA Women's Cup Runner-up: 2011 2013

Individual 

 Her Football Hub team of the month for October 2021

Personal life 
McCatty has done philanthropic work in Zambia.

See also

References

Further reading
 Caudwell, Jayne (2011), Women's Football in the UK: Continuing with Gender Analyses, Routledge, 
 Grainey, Timothy (2012), Beyond Bend It Like Beckham: The Global Phenomenon of Women's Soccer, University of Nebraska Press, 
 Scraton, S., Magee, J., Caudwell, J. (2008), Women, Football and Europe: Histories, Equity and Experience (Ifi) (Vol 1), Meyer & Meyer Fachverlag und Buchhandel GmbH, 
 Stewart, Barbara (2012), Women's Soccer: The Passionate Game, Greystone Books, 
 Williams, Jean (2003), A Game for Rough Girls?: A History of Women's Football in Britain, Routledge,

External links 
 
 Bristol City player profile
 
 

1989 births
Living people
Women's Super League players
Women's Championship (England) players
Bristol Academy W.F.C. players
Durham W.F.C. players
English women's footballers
Women's association football defenders
Universiade gold medalists for Great Britain
Universiade medalists in football
Medalists at the 2013 Summer Universiade